Martin Špaňhel (born July 1, 1977) is a Czech former professional ice hockey player who played in the National Hockey League (NHL).  Credited with the first "unofficial" goal in Columbus Blue Jackets franchise history, scoring in a preseason game in Pittsburgh on September 15, he played 10 regular season games with Columbus during the team's first two seasons. Špaňhel currently is the Commissioner of the Columbus Adult Hockey League.

Career statistics

Regular season and playoffs

International

Transactions
 July 8, 1995 - Drafted by the Philadelphia Flyers in the 6th round, 152nd overall.
 November 13, 1995 - Traded with a 1st and 4th round draft pick to the San Jose Sharks for Pat Falloon.
 November 13, 1995 - Traded with Václav Varaďa and a 1st round pick for Doug Bodger.
 May 30, 2000 - Signed by the Columbus Blue Jackets as a free agent.

References

External links

The Columbus Adult Hockey League

1977 births
Living people
Cincinnati Cyclones (ECHL) players
Columbus Blue Jackets players
Czech expatriate sportspeople in Norway
Czech ice hockey left wingers
HC Plzeň players
HC Sparta Praha players
HIFK (ice hockey) players
Lethbridge Hurricanes players
Lillehammer IK players
Moose Jaw Warriors players
Sportspeople from Zlín
Philadelphia Flyers draft picks
PSG Berani Zlín players
Syracuse Crunch players
Czech expatriate ice hockey players in the United States
Czech expatriate ice hockey players in Canada
Czech expatriate ice hockey players in Finland
Czech expatriate sportspeople in Denmark
Expatriate ice hockey players in Denmark
Expatriate ice hockey players in Norway